The Gurrumul Story is the first compilation album from Geoffrey Gurrumul Yunupingu. The album was announced on 6 August 2021 and was released on 10 September 2021 on digital platforms, CD, deluxe CD+DVD and vinyl. The deluxe edition features a DVD including a 25-minute documentary covering Yunupingu's life and rise to stardom.

Background and release
Geoffrey Gurrumul Yunupingu was born blind in 1971 as a member of the Gumatj clan and a speaker of the indigenous Yolŋu languages, on Elcho Island, off the coast of North East Arnhem land in Australia's Northern Territory. He incorporated much of his heritage into his music, singing in multiple Yolŋu languages as well as English.

Yunupingu released four studio albums on Skinnyfish Music, all of which won ARIA Music Awards.

Yunupingu died in 2017 at the age of 46, following health issues with his liver and kidneys. He was posthumously signed to Decca Australia in November 2020. This is the first release on Decca.

On 6 August 2021, a trailer for The Gurrumul Story documentary was released alongside a reworked version of his 2008 song "Wiyathul", shared with its music video that shows a group of First Nations people performing what an introduction described as "A sacred totemic dance of the Wiyathul bird."

Track listing

Charts

Release history

References

2021 albums
Geoffrey Gurrumul Yunupingu albums
Compilation albums published posthumously
Compilation albums by Australian artists